Émile Leva (born 13 December 1931) is a Belgian middle-distance runner. He competed in the men's 800 metres at the 1956 Summer Olympics.

References

1931 births
Living people
Athletes (track and field) at the 1956 Summer Olympics
Belgian male middle-distance runners
Olympic athletes of Belgium
Place of birth missing (living people)